Nitella tenuissima is a species of alga belonging to the family Characeae.

It has cosmopolitan distribution.

References

Charophyta